The Military ranks of the Italian Social Republic were the military insignia used by the Italian Armed Forces of the Italian Social Republic. The ranks were essentially the same as the Military ranks of the Kingdom of Italy, however, with the symbols of the monarchy removed.

Commissioned officer ranks
The rank insignia of commissioned officers.

Other ranks
The rank insignia of non-commissioned officers and enlisted personnel.

References

Bibliography

Italy, Social Republic